Herbert R. Hunt (1885–1961) was an American architect from Providence, Rhode Island.

He was born in Lowell, Massachusetts, and was working as a draftsman by age 15.  By 1915, he was working as an architect in Providence.  Around 1917 he left the city, returning in 1922.  His most prominent surviving building is the Rosedale Apartments in Cranston, built in 1939.  Hunt retired in 1954 and died in 1961 at the age of 74.

A great deal of Hunt's work was for the Cherry & Webb Company and associated businesses.

Works
 1917 - Cherry & Webb Building, 139 S Main St, Fall River, Massachusetts
 1925 - Herbert R. Hunt House, 1080 Narragansett Blvd, Cranston, Rhode Island
 1925 - O'Gorman Building, 93 Eddy St, Providence, Rhode Island
 1934 - Cherry & Webb Warehouse, 117 Merrimack St, Lowell, Massachusetts
 1939 - Rosedale Apartments, 1180 Narragansett Blvd, Cranston, Rhode Island
 1939 - WPRO Radio Station, 1502 Wampanoag Tr, East Providence, Rhode Island
 Demolished

References

1885 births
1961 deaths
Architects from Massachusetts
Architects from Providence, Rhode Island